USS Wanderer is a name used more than once by the United States Navy:

 , a schooner and former slave trader seized by the Navy and in service from 1861 to 1865 during the American Civil War.
 ,  a motor boat in commission as a patrol vessel from 1917 to 1918
 , a steam yacht built in 1897 and in commissioned Navy service as a patrol vessel from 1917 to 1919

See also
 , the main article about the history of USS Wanderer (1857) as a slave ship before her United States Navy service

United States Navy ship names